John Joseph Keily (1854–1928) was an Irish prelate of the Roman Catholic Church.

The son of Bartholomew and Margaret Keily, he was born on 23 June 1854 in Limerick, Ireland. He was ordained a priest on 6 May 1877 before being elevated to the episcopate as Bishop of Plymouth on 21 April 1911, a post he held until his death on 23 September 1928; at the age of 74. He was buried at St Augustine's Priory Cemetery, Plymouth. On 13 December 1998 he was re-interred in the Lady Chapel vault at Plymouth Cathedral.

St Boniface's Catholic College in Plymouth has a House named after him.

See also
St Boniface's Catholic College, Plymouth

Notes

1854 births
1928 deaths
20th-century Roman Catholic bishops in England
Roman Catholic bishops of Plymouth
Clergy from Limerick (city)